São Jorge is a settlement in the northern part of the island of Fogo, Cape Verde. It is situated near the coast, 2 km west of Campanas Baixo, 2 km northeast of Galinheiro and 15 km northeast of the island capital São Filipe.

Sights 

Ponta da Salina is a headland close to the village. There is a small natural harbour and a bay with basalt rock formations, one of which looks like a natural arch. There are some natural swimming pools and a dark sand beach where swimming is possible if the sea is not too rough. There is a sightworthy old cemetery, which is surrounded by a wall, close to the beach. Most of the graves have very simple wooden crosses without any names.

References 

Villages and settlements in Fogo, Cape Verde
São Filipe, Cape Verde